Sebastian Furchner (born May 3, 1982) is a German former professional ice hockey player. He played for Kölner Haie and Grizzlys Wolfsburg in the Deutsche Eishockey Liga (DEL). He was signed to a five-year contract extension with Wolfsburg on September 16, 2015.

Nearing the completion of 2021–22 season, captaining his fourth season with Grizzlys Wolfsburg, Furchner opted to announce his retirement from professional hockey due to injury in concluding a 23-year career on 24 March 2022.

Career statistics

Regular season and playoffs

International

References

External links

1982 births
Living people
German ice hockey left wingers
Ice hockey players at the 2006 Winter Olympics
Olympic ice hockey players of Germany
ESV Kaufbeuren players
People from Kaufbeuren
Sportspeople from Swabia (Bavaria)
Kölner Haie players
Grizzlys Wolfsburg players